Arlington most often refers to:

Arlington, Virginia
Arlington National Cemetery, a United States military cemetery
Arlington, Texas
Arlington may also refer to:

Places

Australia
Arlington light rail station, on the Inner West Light Rail in Sydney

Canada
Arlington, Nova Scotia
Rural Municipality of Arlington No. 79, Saskatchewan
Arlington, Yukon

South Africa
Arlington, Free State

United Kingdom
Arlington, Devon
Arlington, East Sussex
Arlington, Gloucestershire

United States
Arlington, Alabama
Arlington, Arizona
Arlington, California
Arlington, Colorado
Arlington (Jacksonville), a geographical section east of downtown Jacksonville, Florida
Arlington, Georgia
Arlington, Illinois
Arlington, Monroe County, Indiana
Arlington, Rush County, Indiana
Arlington, Iowa
Arlington, Kansas
Arlington, Kentucky
Arlington, Baltimore, Maryland
Arlington, Massachusetts, a town in Middlesex County
Arlington station (MBTA), on the Green Line, Boston, Massachusetts
Arlington Township, Michigan
Arlington, Minnesota
Arlington, Missouri
Arlington, Nebraska
Arlington, New Jersey
Arlington, New York
Arlington, Staten Island, New York, a neighborhood
Arlington, North Carolina
Arlington, Ohio, a village in Hancock County
Arlington, Montgomery County, Ohio, an unincorporated community
Arlington, Oregon
Arlington (Pittsburgh), Pennsylvania, a neighborhood
Arlington, South Dakota
Arlington, Tennessee
Arlington, Texas
Arlington, Vermont
Arlington, Northampton County, Virginia
Arlington, Washington
Arlington, Harrison County, West Virginia
Arlington, Upshur County, West Virginia
Arlington (town), Wisconsin
Arlington, Wisconsin, a village

Historic homes
Arlington (Columbia, Maryland), a historic plantation
Arlington (Westover, Maryland), a historic home
Arlington (Natchez, Mississippi), a historic house
Arlington Antebellum Home & Gardens in Birmingham, Alabama
Arlington House, The Robert E. Lee Memorial in Arlington County, Virginia

Ships
SS Arlington, a steamship that sank in Lake Superior in 1940
USS Arlington (APA-129), a Haskell-class attack transport
USS Arlington (AGMR-2), a command ship
USS Arlington (LPD-24), a San Antonio-class amphibious transport dock

Other uses 
Arlington (band), an American rock group from Southern California
"Arlington" (song), by Trace Adkins, 2005
Arlington Steward, a character in the 2009 American psychological thriller film The Box
Baron Arlington, a title
The Arlington, a mixed-use skyscraper in Charlotte, North Carolina, U.S.

People with the given name 
 Sir Arlington Butler (1938–2017), Bahamian teacher, lawyer, and politician
 Arlington Hambright (born 1996), American football player
 Arlington Nelson Lindenmuth (1856–1950), American landscape and portrait painter
 Arlington G. Reynolds (1849–1934), Republican politician from Ohio who was Speaker of the Ohio House of Representatives from 1900 to 1901
 Arlington Valles (1886–1970), Academy Award-winning Hollywood costume designer from London
 Arlington P. Van Dyke (1926–1990), American businessman and politician from New York

See also

Arlington Archeological Site in Northampton County, Virginia
Arlington Fleet Group, rail maintenance and repair company based in Eastleigh Works, Hampshire, United Kingdom
Arlington Heights (disambiguation)
Arlington High School (disambiguation)
Arlington Hotel (disambiguation)
Arlington House (disambiguation)
Arlington Plantation (disambiguation)
Arlington Stadium, former home of Major League Baseball's Texas Rangers
Arlington station (disambiguation), railway stations and other places with similar names
Arlington Theater, Santa Barbara, California
Darlington (disambiguation)
Harlington (disambiguation)
USS Arlington, a list of U.S. naval ships